Cachopo is a dish characteristic of Asturian cuisine. It consists of two large veal fillets and includes ham and cheese, and typically has a side of french fries(known there as "patatas fritas"). The dish is eaten fried and hot after being breaded in eggs and breadcrumbs, and it is usually served garnished with potatoes, peppers, or mushrooms.

The first evidence of the cachopo dish is from doctor Gaspar Casal, in the early eighteenth century.

There are multiple variables of this dish including fish cachopos, chicken or pork cachopos stuffed with seafood, meat, mushrooms, peppers, cheese, asparagus, etc.

See also 
 Cordon bleu (dish)
 Karađorđeva šnicla
 Dishes à la Maréchale
 Chicken Kiev
 Breaded cutlet
 List of stuffed dishes

References 

Asturian cuisine
Veal dishes